Dalton Keene (born April 14, 1999) is an American football tight end for the Philadelphia Eagles of the National Football League (NFL). He played college football at Virginia Tech.

Early life and high school
Keene grew up in Littleton, Colorado and attended Chatfield High School, where he played middle linebacker and running back on the football team and also ran track. He was named first-team All-State as a senior after rushing for 1,175 rushing yards and 18 touchdowns.

College career
Keene started 12 games as a true freshman and caught 10 passes for 167 yards. He was named honorable mention All-Atlantic Coast Conference after recording 28 receptions for 341 yards and three touchdowns in his sophomore season. As a junior, Keene caught 21 passes for 240 yards and five touchdowns. Following the end of the season, Keene announced that he would forgo his final year of eligibility to enter the 2020 NFL Draft. Keene finished his collegiate career with 59 receptions for 748 yards and eight touchdowns in 39 games played.

Professional career

New England Patriots
Keene was selected in the third round with the 101st overall pick in the 2020 NFL Draft by the New England Patriots. The Patriots acquired the pick from a division rival, the New York Jets, trading two fourth-round picks in the 2020 draft and a sixth-round pick in the 2021 NFL Draft. It was the first time in Bill Belichick's 20 years as head coach of the Patriots that the team included a future draft pick to move up in a draft. He made his NFL debut in Week 7, recording one catch for eight yards. He was placed on injured reserve on November 10, 2020, with a knee injury. He was activated on December 5, 2020.

On August 7, 2021, Keene was placed on injured reserve with a knee injury.

On August 21, 2022, the Patriots waived Keene.

Philadelphia Eagles
On September 6, 2022, Keene was signed to the Philadelphia Eagles practice squad. He was released on October 4.

Denver Broncos
On October 15, 2022, Keene was signed to the Denver Broncos practice squad. He was released three days later. On December 27, 2022, Keene was re-signed by the Broncos to their practice squad.  His practice squad contract with the team expired after the season on January 8, 2023.

Philadelphia Eagles (second stint)
On January 20, 2023, Keene was signed to a reserve/future contract by the Philadelphia Eagles.

References

External links
Virginia Tech Hokies bio
New England Patriots bio

1999 births
Living people
Players of American football from Colorado
Sportspeople from the Denver metropolitan area
Sportspeople from Littleton, Colorado
American football tight ends
Virginia Tech Hokies football players
New England Patriots players
Philadelphia Eagles players
Denver Broncos players